Aleksandr Yakovlevich Orlov (6 April 1880, in Smolensk – 28 January 1954, in Kiev) was an astronomer and pioneer of geodynamics.

Orlov studied at Saint Petersburg University, graduating with distinction in 1902. He subsequently developed his scientific background through study at the University of Paris, at the University of Lund under Carl Charlier then at the University of Göttingen under with Johann Emil Wiechert.

In 1927, Orlov was elected a corresponding member of the Academy of Sciences of the USSR; in 1934-38 he was a professor of astronomy at the P. K. Sternberg Astronomical Institute in Moscow. From 1938 to 1951, he again headed the Poltava Observatory, and in 1939 he became a member of the Academy of Sciences of the Ukrainian SSR.
He contributed the essay “Astronomic Utopias” to the 1928 book Life and Technology of the Future  in which he discussed the possibility of settling on Mars and the Moon.

Orlov played a major role in the creation of the Main Astronomical Observatory of the National Academy of Sciences of Ukraine, based in Golosseevo outside Kiev. He was appointed as the first director in 1944, a position he held until 1948, and again from 1951 to 1952.

References

1880 births
1954 deaths
Soviet astronomers
University of Paris alumni
Astronomers from the Russian Empire
Expatriates from the Russian Empire in France
Expatriates from the Russian Empire in Sweden
Expatriates from the Russian Empire in Germany